Tsacho Andreykovski (born 10 October 1954) is a Bulgarian boxer. He competed at the 1976 Summer Olympics and the 1980 Summer Olympics. At the 1976 Summer Olympics, he defeated Aldo Cosentino of France, before losing to Ku Yong-jo of North Korea.

References

1954 births
Living people
Bulgarian male boxers
Olympic boxers of Bulgaria
Boxers at the 1976 Summer Olympics
Boxers at the 1980 Summer Olympics
People from Lovech
Bantamweight boxers